Hao Jie (born 16 October 1984) is a Chinese former professional tennis player.

She won two doubles titles on the ITF Women's Circuit. Her career-high singles ranking is No. 329, achieved on 21 May 2007. Her best doubles ranking was 307 on 1 November 2004. She has been part of the China Fed Cup team.

Hao played at the Guangzhou International Open doubles event with Sun Tiantian, but lost in the first round. She played on many other WTA Tour and ITF events.

ITF finals

Singles: 2 (0–2)

Doubles: 7 (2–5)

External links
 
 
 Jie Hao at tennislive.net
 Jie Hao at Eurosport

Chinese female tennis players
1984 births
Living people
21st-century Chinese women
Soft tennis players at the 2010 Asian Games
Asian Games bronze medalists for China
Asian Games medalists in soft tennis
Medalists at the 2010 Asian Games